Ground Zero is a 1987 Australian drama-thriller about a cinematographer who, prompted by curiosity about some old film footage taken by his father, embarks on a quest to find out the truth about British nuclear tests at Maralinga. It stars actors Colin Friels, Jack Thompson and Indigenous activist Burnum Burnum.

Production and cast
Ground Zero was produced in 1986 and released in 1987. IMDb, and the DVD release of the film, both credit Michael Pattinson and Bruce Myles as producers, but only Pattinson is named in other sources. Pattinson went on to direct several other Australian feature films, including Wendy Cracked a Walnut (1990), Secrets (1992), and The Limbic Region (1997). Myles did not go on to other directing, but acted in numerous subsequent Australian films, including The Bank (2001).

Sound for the film was created by a team including Roger Savage and Gary Wilkins, who had both worked on the Mad Max series of feature movies.

Context of the film
In the 1950s, the British government had conducted a number of nuclear tests at a site called Maralinga in outback South Australia. It was subsequently demonstrated by medical evidence, witness statements and archive documents that during those tests, armed forces personnel and Indigenous Australians were exposed to nuclear fallout that affected their health and reduced their lifespan. This led eventually to a major inquiry, the McClelland Royal Commission, which reported in 1985. The inquiry attracted a lot of publicity, and ultimately a deal was struck with the United Kingdom to fund rehabilitation of the test sites.

Ground Zero was made immediately following this inquiry. While fictional, it explores the idea that the exposure to radiation of Indigenous people and army personnel may have been deliberate, or known about at the time and concealed. The political topicality of the film at the time of its release was reflected in the profile of some of the actors involved: Colin Friels has played a number of roles involving social activism, most notably years later in the Australian television miniseries Bastard Boys; Burnum Burnum was a long-time Indigenous rights activist; while Jack Thompson had previously played a leading role in another film sharply critical of the British military: Breaker Morant.

Reception and legacy
Despite its success at the 1987 AFI Awards, reviews of the film were mixed. Pointing out that the film contained elements of both action thriller and political commentary, reviewers were unsure that it did either with great success. However, Janet Maslin, reviewing the film for the New York Times, wrote of "taut, clever conspiracy-theory thrillers, of which the new Australian film Ground Zero is a prime example".

It was shown on Indigenous television station Imparja 'as a tribute' to Burnum Burnum after his death in 1997.

Cast

Awards and nominations
AFI Awards, 1987
Won: Best Achievement in Cinematography
Won: Best Achievement in Editing
Won: Best Achievement in Production Design
Won: Best Achievement in Sound
Nominated: Best Actor
Nominated: Best Supporting Actor
Nominated: Best Director
Nominated: Best Film
Nominated: Best Original Screenplay

38th Berlin International Film Festival, 1988
Nominated: Golden Berlin Bear

Box office
Ground Zero grossed $178,576 at the box office in Australia.

See also
Cinema of Australia

References

External links
 
Ground Zero at Oz Movies

1987 films
Australian thriller drama films
1980s thriller drama films
Cold War films
Films about nuclear war and weapons

Films directed by Bruce Myles
Films directed by Michael Pattinson
Films scored by Chris Neal (songwriter)
Films set in South Australia
Films set in Melbourne
Films shot in Melbourne
Films shot in South Australia
Australian action adventure films
1987 drama films
1980s English-language films